My Fair Lady with the Un-original Cast is an album by drummer Shelly Manne with Jack Sheldon and Irene Kral and musical direction by Johnny Williams, recorded in 1964 and released on the Capitol label. The album, featuring Alan Jay Lerner and Frederick Loewe's music from the Broadway musical My Fair Lady, sought to capitalize on Manne's previously successful My Fair Lady album and the contemporaneous film adaptation.

Reception

The AllMusic review stated: "An interesting but not essential release".

Track listing
All compositions by Alan Jay Lerner and Frederick Loewe
 "Overture/Why Can't the English" – 3:45
 "Wouldn't It Be Loverly" – 3:00
 "With a Little Bit of Luck" – 3:15
 "I'm an Ordinary Man" – 3:38
 "The Rain in Spain" – 4:38
 "I Could Have Danced All Night" – 2:38
 "Ascot Gavotte" – 2:29
 "On the Street Where You Live" – 3:20
 "You Did It" – 2:16
 "Show Me" – 2:57 		
 "Get Me to the Church on Time" – 3:30 		
 "I've Grown Accustomed to Her Face" – 4:00

Personnel
Shelly Manne – drums
Irene Kral (tracks 2, 5 & 10), Jack Sheldon (tracks 1, 4, 5 & 9)- vocals 
Conte Candoli, Al Porcino, Don Sleet, Ray Triscari, Jimmy Zito – trumpet
Bob Edmondson, Frank Rosolino, Mike Barone – trombone
Richard Perissi, James Decker – French horn
John Bambridge – tuba
Charlie Kennedy – alto saxophone
Jack Nimitz, Justin Gordon, Paul Horn – woodwinds 
Russ Freeman – piano
Monty Budwig – bass
John Williams – arranger, musical director
Unidentified string section

References

1964 albums
Capitol Records albums
Shelly Manne albums
Albums produced by Dave Cavanaugh

Albums recorded at Capitol Studios